Benedikt Brydern started as a musical protege on the violin giving his first public concerts at the age of 10. He lives in Los Angeles now and composes for film and the concert hall. He has won numerous awards and competitions. He studied with film composers David Raksin, Bruce Broughton, Christopher Young and Elmer Bernstein at the University of California Thornton School of Music in Los Angeles.Immediately after graduation he composed music for Jon Voight's Showtime film The Tin Soldier.

Composer credits:
 Echoes of Fear (2019 film) 
 Sacrifice (2016 film) 
 Stag Night 
 The Pagan Queen
 Standing Ovation 
 Dark Remains
 The Wild and Wonderful Whites of West Virginia
 Jaded

Performer credits :
 Terminator: The Sarah Connor Chronicles (soundtrack)
 Midwinter Graces
 Yanni Voices
 The Dream Concert: Live from the Great Pyramids of Egypt
 Live at El Morro, Puerto Rico

References
Sources

Citations

External links
 
 

Living people
German violinists
German composers
1966 births
21st-century American violinists
American film score composers
American television composers
American male film score composers
Male television composers
21st-century American male musicians